O Jogo (English: The Game) was a Brazilian reality show Broadcast on Rede Globo between May 27 and July 29, 2003, on Tuesday nights. It was a Brazilian version of the FOX Television show, Murder in Small Town X.

Premise 
The plot of the program focused of the murder of businessman Wagner Klein, director of Paes Brasil School, in the fictional city of Santo Antônio. Was one of the Candidate's for mayor of the city, Wagner was married with Professor of Biology Priscila Klein, a woman unhappy with her marriage with him, and had a son, Maurício Klein, mysterious young Man who despite relying on his fathers income, distanced himself from the family. After his mysterious murder, it was discovered that the director was also a man full of enemies - with at least 12 suspects who could have committed the crime.

The murder, committed on the Klein family's boat, was recorded by the murderer himself who, without showing his identity, proposed a game, describing 12 suspects - one among them as him/her - and asking a question: "Who am I?". To unravel the mystery, 12 wannabe investigators, entered the fictional city to solve the mystery and claim the cash reward. Each week, the investigators were sent out on varying missions around the town in order to discover clues to clear suspects. Additionally, the murderer would strike again, clearing suspects as well.

At the beginning of each episode, one investigator would be appointed as the Lead Investigator, who would have specific responsibilities and powers. The investigators would be split into teams by the Lead Investigator, and sent down different "leads". During the investigation, the team would be given a task by the killer to take out one of the innocent suspects for a chance to accumulate R$25,000 for every time they get the correct suspect for the day. Failing to do the task or giving the wrong answer would mean the money wasn't added to the total pot. 
A maximum potential was R$250,000 (Adjusted for 2020's value, R$652,764) for clearing all ten suspects correctly, however the team got two suspects wrong meaning the final pot was left at R$200,000 for solving the case.

At some point during the investigation days in each episode the killer would leave some form of message, consisting of maps with the two locations attached. Signaling the start of each episodes elimination, The "Final Investigation". Every investigator except the lead investigator could vote and the investigator with the most votes would be chosen as the first person to conduct the "Final Investigation". The Lead Investigator would then choose any investigator to be the second person for the "Final Investigation". The two chosen investigators pick from two envelopes to decide who will go to either of the two locations given.

In the "Final Investigation"., the two selected investigators would be sent to two different remote locations completely alone, with their movements recorded only by a head-mounted camera and a flashlight, they also had to follow a map to where the "clue" would be located. One of the chosen investigators would discover an important clue that would help solve the mystery, whereas the other investigator would be eliminated from the show as "murdered by the killer".

The eliminated contestant would choose the Lead Investigator for the next episode, by means of a prerecorded "last will and testament".

The Investigators 
The following list are the contestants that took part in the show, in the order of Elimination.

The Suspects 
The Following list are the suspects that the investigators had to figure out who the murder was.

Winning Moment 

In the final event of the show, Both Breno and Elaine were the last two investigators left in the show. Breno who was the lead investigator chose Tadeu as the killer, while Elaine picked Maria. In the end both went off to their respected locations, in the end the killer was revealed to be Maria.

Her motive to murder was a follows; Maria had an affair with Wagner Klein, when her father found out about it, he committed suicide. As part of a confession in her final location at the chapel, she had been planning for the right time to not only murder the Klein family but also anyone from a Satanic sect who didn't agree to follow on her plans. Among the plans she has was to kidnap and kill Maurício Klein and Alice Erthal's son João Pedro. However the cops got to Maria and J escaped. But when cornered, Maria ended up committing suicide in the end. 
Elaine was then awarded the cash prize of R$200,000 Reais. (Adjusted to 2020's value is R$522,211)

Brazilian reality television series